The Men's 400 metres T54 event at the 2012 Summer Paralympics took place at the London Olympic Stadium from 5 to 7 September.

Records
Prior to the competition, the existing World and Paralympic records were as follows:

Results

Round 1
Competed 5 September 2012 from 19:51. Qual. rule: first 2 in each heat (Q) plus the 2 fastest other times (q) qualified.

Heat 1

Heat 2

Heat 3

Final
Competed 7 September 2012 at 20:47.

Q = qualified by place. q = qualified by time. PB = Personal Best. SB = Seasonal Best. DQ = Disqualified.

References

Athletics at the 2012 Summer Paralympics